Aaron Kevin Isaac Rowe (born 7 September 2000) is an English professional footballer who plays for Stockport County on loan from Huddersfield Town as a winger.

Club career

Leyton Orient

Youth career
Rowe joined Leyton Orient and made a number of appearances for their under 18 side during the 2016 to 2018 period.

Huddersfield Town

Rowe signed for Huddersfield Town as a youth player in February 2018. He made his senior debut on 9 March 2019, in a 2–0 home Premier League defeat against AFC Bournemouth. 

On 27 March 2019, Rowe signed a three year  professional contract up to the end of the 2021-22 season. 

He scored his first goal for the club on 9 January 2021 in a 3-2 FA Cup defeat to Plymouth Argyle. and his first league goal on 17 April 2021 in the 2-0 EFL Championship away win against Nottingham Forest.

On 31 January 2023, Rowe joined League Two club Stockport County on loan for the remainder of the season.

Personal life
Rowe is the younger brother of former Southampton man Omar Rowe, who has played in Cyprus.

Career Statistics

References

External links

2000 births
Living people
Footballers from the London Borough of Hackney
Association football wingers
English footballers
Leyton Orient F.C. players
Huddersfield Town A.F.C. players
Boston United F.C. players
Bromley F.C. players
Stockport County F.C. players
Premier League players
National League (English football) players
English Football League players